The women's pentathlon event  at the 1994 European Athletics Indoor Championships was held in Palais Omnisports de Paris-Bercy on 11 March.

Results

References

Combined events at the European Athletics Indoor Championships
Pentathlon
1994 in women's athletics